The Uzbekistan national field hockey team represents Uzbekistan in international field hockey competitions. It is ranked  in the world.

Tournament History

Asian Games
 2022 – Qualified

AHF Cup
1997 – 5th place
2008 – 6th place
2012 – 5th place
2016 – 5th place
2022 – 8th place

AHF Central Asia Cup
 2019 –

Hockey Series
 2018-19 – Finals

See also
 Uzbekistan women's national field hockey team

References 

Asian men's national field hockey teams
Field hockey
National team